The Espanola Eagles (aka Espanola Screaming Eagles) were a Canadian Junior ice hockey team. The team was coached for eighteen years by Red McCarthy who then managed it for another four. The Eagles were located in Espanola, Ontario and played in the Memorial Cup-eligible Northern Ontario Junior Hockey Association and later the Centennial Cup-eligible Northern Ontario Junior Hockey League.

The Eagles played from 1962 until 2003 when their franchise was bought by interests in Michigan and relocated. The team was renamed the Northern Michigan Black Bears. The Bears existed from 2003–2006, then became the Soo Indians from 2008–2012. The team was then renamed again and from 2012–2015 was known as the Soo Eagles. From 2015 to the present, the team has been known as the New Jersey Junior Titans.

Season-by-season results

External links
Eagles website
NOJHL website

Northern Ontario Junior Hockey League teams
1962 establishments in Ontario
2003 disestablishments in Ontario
Ice hockey clubs established in 1962
Ice hockey clubs disestablished in 2003
Espanola, Ontario